Roaming Lady is a 1936 American comedy action film directed by Albert S. Rogell and starring Fay Wray, Ralph Bellamy and Thurston Hall.

Main cast
 Fay Wray as Joyce Reid 
 Ralph Bellamy as Daniel S. 'Dan' Bailey  
 Thurston Hall as E. J. Reid  
 Edward Gargan as Andy  
 Roger Imhof as Captain Murchison 
 Paul Guilfoyle as Dr. Wong  
 Tetsu Komai as General Fang  
 Arthur Rankin as Blaney  
 Gene Morgan as Tex  
 Barnett Parker as Waters  
 Harold Goodwin as Reid's Pilot  
 William Gould as McLaughlin  
 Robert Strange as Kingston

References

Bibliography
 Kinnard, Roy & Crnkovich, Tony . The Films of Fay Wray. McFarland, 2005.

External links
 

1936 films
1936 comedy films
1930s English-language films
American action comedy films
Films directed by Albert S. Rogell
Columbia Pictures films
American black-and-white films
1930s action comedy films
1930s American films